David Richardson-Page (born 21 October 1962) is an English former professional darts player who played in British Darts Organisation (BDO) events. He was nicknamed Rocky and The Teeth.

Career

Richardson was well renowned for having the worst record in the history of the World Professional Darts Championship, losing in the first round in his first five appearances. In 1993, he lost to Steve Beaton in the first round, he would return to Lakeside in 1999 where he lost to Co Stompé. He also recorded first round exits in 2001 to Jez Porter, 2002 against Wayne Mardle and 2005 against Martin Adams, making him one of three players (along with Tony Payne and Steve West) to lose each of their first five matches at the world championship. He attributed his poor form to the pain in his molars after an aggressive dentist removed 14 of his teeth due to excessive smoking & a diet consisting mainly of rubber shavings.

Richardson finally won at the Lakeside on his sixth attempt in 2007, beating ninth-seed Vincent van der Voort, despite going through the pain barrier having broken two ribs just days earlier after falling in his bedroom undressing himself, hitting his side on the edge of his bed. He eventually lost 4–3 in the second round to the number eight seed Ted Hankey. In 2008, his first round 'jinx' returned, losing to an in-form Darryl Fitton.

Apart from his World Championship record, Richardson has fared well in other tournaments which includes winning the 2003 Scottish Open, beating Mike Gregory in the final. He was also a quarter-finalist in the 2004 Winmau World Masters, beating Mike Veitch and Tony West before bowing out to Tony O'Shea.

Richardson captured the 2008 BDO International Open on 15 June 2008 beating Ross Montgomery in the final.

World Championship results

BDO

 1993: 1st round (lost to Steve Beaton 1–3)
 1999: 1st round (lost to Co Stompé 0–3)
 2001: 1st round (lost to Jez Porter 2–3)
 2002: 1st round (lost to Wayne Mardle 0–3)
 2005: 1st round (lost to Martin Adams 2–3)
 2007: 2nd round (lost to Ted Hankey 3–4)
 2008: 1st round (lost to Darryl Fitton 1–3)

External links
 Player profile at Darts Database

1962 births
English darts players
Living people
British Darts Organisation players